Romania participated at the 2010 Winter Olympics in Vancouver, British Columbia, Canada. Twenty-nine athletes have qualified for the Olympiad. The Romanian flag was carried by Éva Tófalvi during the opening ceremonies.

Alpine skiing

Three athletes have qualified:

Biathlon 

There were five female athletes that qualified:

Bobsleigh

Two-man

Two-woman

Four-man

Cross-country skiing 

Romania has three spots for this discipline.

Distance

Sprint

Figure skating

Romania has qualified 1 entrant in men's singles, for a total of 1 athlete.

Freestyle skiing 

Ski cross

Luge 

There are eight athletes qualified.

Short track speed skating

Skeleton 

It was the first time Romania sent an athlete to this event:

References

2010 in Romanian sport
Nations at the 2010 Winter Olympics
2010